Etobicoke North GO Station is a GO Transit train and bus station on the Kitchener line in the Etobicoke district of Toronto, Ontario, Canada. It is located at 1949 Kipling Avenue just north of Belfield Road, close to the junction of Highways 401 and 409.

Overview

The station has 3 mainline tracks and a single platform serving only the northernmost track. A fourth track passes along the north side of the station, but it is only used for local freight access so it is fenced off from the platform.

The platform can accommodate trains up to 12 cars long, and contains heated shelters and upgraded LED lighting.

History
The station opened in late 1974, less than a year after GO Transit began operating the Georgetown (now Kitchener) line.

In 2013, construction began on the Georgetown South railway expansion project. In order to accommodate a widened railway and a significantly increased number of express trains, the original tracks and platforms were demolished and replaced. While the previous arrangement had been a 2-track railway with a side platform on the south side, the new configuration would be a 3-track railway with a side platform on the north side. The north parking lot was expanded to accommodate a new passenger pick-up and drop-off area and a bus loop, and the station building was also upgraded.

Until 29 June 2019, GO Transit operated connecting bus service at the station on route 38A, which operated during peak periods between Etobicoke North and Caledon via Humber College, Woodbridge and Bolton.

Future
, Metrolinx is considering replacing its Etobicoke North GO Station with a new GO station about 2 kilometres west, near Woodbine Racetrack. Demolishing the current Etobicoke North station would free up space for the railway to be widened from 3 mainline tracks to 4.

Services
The station is served by Kitchener line local train services, but not Kitchener line bus services or express train services. As a result, there is no service on weekends. Because the station only has a single platform, there is also no service during peak periods in the counter-peak direction.

Via Rail, UP Express and GO Transit express trains pass through the station without stopping. It is the only station along the Union Pearson Express route where those trains do not stop. The spur line to Pearson International Airport branches away approximately four kilometres west of the station, just past the underpass with Highway 427.

Connecting transit
The closest bus stops are a short distance south on Kipling Avenue at Belfield Road, served by Toronto Transit Commission routes 45 Kipling & 945 Kipling Express. The station is connected by staircases and ramps from Kipling Avenue, which crosses below the tracks.

References

External links

GO Transit railway stations
Railway stations in Toronto
Transport in Etobicoke
Year of establishment missing